Sarmas is a rural locality (a settlement) in Gorodetskoye Rural Settlement, Kichmengsko-Gorodetsky District, Vologda Oblast, Russia. The population was 104 as of 2002. There are 2 streets.

Geography 
Sarmas is located 67 km northwest of Kichmengsky Gorodok (the district's administrative centre) by road. Kazarino is the nearest rural locality.

References 

Rural localities in Kichmengsko-Gorodetsky District